Henryk Glacier is a glacier on Arctowski Peninsula, on the Danco Coast of Antarctica, with a noteworthy cirque at the head; it flows southwest between Wild Spur and Hubl Peak into Errera Channel. The glacier was named in association with the peninsula after Henryk Arctowski, by the Polish Antarctic Expedition, in about 1993.

References

Poland and the Antarctic
Glaciers of Danco Coast